These are the results of the men's C-2 slalom competition in canoeing at the 2004 Summer Olympics.  The C-2 (canoe double) event is raced by two-man canoes through a whitewater course.  The venue for the 2004 Olympic competition was the Olympic Canoe/Kayak Slalom Centre at the Helliniko Olympic Complex.

Medalists

References
2004 Summer Olympics Canoe slalom results 
Sports-reference.com 2004 men's slalom C-2 results
Yahoo! Sports Athens 2004 Summer Olympics Canoe/Kayak Results

Men's Slalom C-2
Men's events at the 2004 Summer Olympics